Probability theory is the branch of mathematics concerned with probability. Although there are several different probability interpretations, probability theory treats the concept in a rigorous mathematical manner by expressing it through a set of axioms. Typically these axioms formalise probability in terms of a probability space, which assigns a measure taking values between 0 and 1, termed the probability measure, to a set of outcomes called the sample space. Any specified subset of the sample space is called an event.
Central subjects in probability theory include discrete and continuous random variables, probability distributions, and stochastic processes (which provide mathematical abstractions of non-deterministic or uncertain processes or measured quantities that may either be single occurrences or evolve over time in a random fashion).
Although it is not possible to perfectly predict random events, much can be said about their behavior. Two major results in probability theory describing such behaviour are the law of large numbers and the central limit theorem.

As a mathematical foundation for statistics, probability theory is essential to many human activities that involve quantitative analysis of data. Methods of probability theory also apply to descriptions of complex systems given only partial knowledge of their state, as in statistical mechanics or sequential estimation. A great discovery of twentieth-century physics was the probabilistic nature of physical phenomena at atomic scales, described in quantum mechanics.

History of probability

The modern mathematical theory of probability has its roots in attempts to analyze games of chance by Gerolamo Cardano in the sixteenth century, and by Pierre de Fermat and Blaise Pascal in the seventeenth century (for example the "problem of points"). Christiaan Huygens published a book on the subject in 1657. In the 19th century, what is considered the classical definition of probability was completed by Pierre Laplace.

Initially, probability theory mainly considered  events, and its methods were mainly combinatorial. Eventually, analytical considerations compelled the incorporation of  variables into the theory.

This culminated in modern probability theory, on foundations laid by Andrey Nikolaevich Kolmogorov. Kolmogorov combined the notion of sample space, introduced by Richard von Mises, and measure theory and presented his axiom system for probability theory in 1933. This became the mostly undisputed axiomatic basis for modern probability theory; but, alternatives exist, such as the adoption of finite rather than countable additivity by Bruno de Finetti.

Treatment
Most introductions to probability theory treat discrete probability distributions and continuous probability distributions separately. The measure theory-based treatment of probability covers the discrete, continuous, a mix of the two, and more.

Motivation
Consider an experiment that can produce a number of outcomes. The set of all outcomes is called the sample space of the experiment. The power set of the sample space (or equivalently, the event space) is formed by considering all different collections of possible results. For example, rolling an honest dice produces one of six possible results. One collection of possible results corresponds to getting an odd number. Thus, the subset {1,3,5} is an element of the power set of the sample space of dice rolls. These collections are called events. In this case, {1,3,5} is the event that the dice falls on some odd number. If the results that actually occur fall in a given event, that event is said to have occurred.

Probability is a way of assigning every "event" a value between zero and one, with the requirement that the event made up of all possible results (in our example, the event {1,2,3,4,5,6}) be assigned a value of one. To qualify as a probability distribution, the assignment of values must satisfy the requirement that if you look at a collection of mutually exclusive events (events that contain no common results, e.g., the events {1,6}, {3}, and {2,4} are all mutually exclusive), the probability that any of these events occurs is given by the sum of the probabilities of the events.

The probability that any one of the events {1,6}, {3}, or {2,4} will occur is 5/6. This is the same as saying that the probability of event {1,2,3,4,6} is 5/6. This event encompasses the possibility of any number except five being rolled. The mutually exclusive event {5} has a probability of 1/6, and the event {1,2,3,4,5,6} has a probability of 1, that is, absolute certainty.

When doing calculations using the outcomes of an experiment, it is necessary that all those elementary events have a number assigned to them. This is done using a random variable. A random variable is a function that assigns to each elementary event in the sample space a real number. This function is usually denoted by a capital letter. In the case of a dice, the assignment of a number to certain elementary events can be done using the identity function. This does not always work. For example, when flipping a coin the two possible outcomes are "heads" and "tails". In this example, the random variable X could assign to the outcome "heads" the number "0" and to the outcome "tails" the number "1".

Discrete probability distributions

 deals with events that occur in countable sample spaces.

Examples: Throwing dice, experiments with decks of cards, random walk, and tossing coins.

:
Initially the probability of an event to occur was defined as the number of cases favorable for the event, over the number of total outcomes possible in an equiprobable sample space: see Classical definition of probability.

:
It is then assumed that for each element , an intrinsic "probability" value  is attached, which satisfies the following properties:
 
 

That is, the probability function f(x) lies between zero and one for every value of x in the sample space Ω, and the sum of f(x) over all values x in the sample space Ω is equal to 1. An  is defined as any subset  of the sample space . The  of the event  is defined as

So, the probability of the entire sample space is 1, and the probability of the null event is 0.

The modern definition does not try to answer how probability mass functions are obtained; instead, it builds a theory that assumes their existence.

Continuous probability distributions

 deals with events that occur in a continuous sample space.

:
The classical definition breaks down when confronted with the continuous case. See Bertrand's paradox.

:
That is, F(x) returns the probability that X will be less than or equal to x.

The CDF necessarily satisfies the following properties.
  is a monotonically non-decreasing, right-continuous function;
 
 

The random variable  is said to have a continuous probability distribution if the corresponding CDF  is continuous.

In case the PDF exists, this can be written as

Whereas the PDF exists only for continuous random variables, the CDF exists for all random variables (including discrete random variables) that take values in 

Measure-theoretic probability theory
The raison d'être of the measure-theoretic treatment of probability is that it unifies the discrete and the continuous cases, and makes the difference a question of which measure is used. Furthermore, it covers distributions that are neither discrete nor continuous nor mixtures of the two.

An example of such distributions could be a mix of discrete and continuous distributions—for example, a random variable that is 0 with probability 1/2, and takes a random value from a normal distribution with probability 1/2.

Other distributions may not even be a mix, for example, the Cantor distribution has no positive probability for any single point, neither does it have a density. The modern approach to probability theory solves these problems using measure theory to define the probability space:

The measure corresponding to a CDF is said to be  by the CDF. This measure coincides with the pmf for discrete variables and PDF for continuous variables, making the measure-theoretic approach free of fallacies.

The probability of a set  in the σ-algebra  is defined as

where the integration is with respect to the measure  induced by 

Along with providing better understanding and unification of discrete and continuous probabilities, measure-theoretic treatment also allows us to work on probabilities outside , as in the theory of stochastic processes. For example, to study Brownian motion, probability is defined on a space of functions.

When it's convenient to work with a dominating measure, the Radon-Nikodym theorem is used to define a density as the Radon-Nikodym derivative of the probability distribution of interest with respect to this dominating measure.  Discrete densities are usually defined as this derivative with respect to a counting measure over the set of all possible outcomes.  Densities for absolutely continuous distributions are usually defined as this derivative with respect to the Lebesgue measure.  If a theorem can be proved in this general setting, it holds for both discrete and continuous distributions as well as others;  separate proofs are not required for discrete and continuous distributions.

Classical probability distributions

Certain random variables occur very often in probability theory because they well describe many natural or physical processes. Their distributions, therefore, have gained special importance in probability theory. Some fundamental discrete distributions are the discrete uniform, Bernoulli, binomial, negative binomial, Poisson and geometric distributions. Important continuous distributions include the continuous uniform, normal, exponential, gamma and beta distributions.

Convergence of random variables

In probability theory, there are several notions of convergence for random variables. They are listed below in the order of strength, i.e., any subsequent notion of convergence in the list implies convergence according to all of the preceding notions.

Weak convergence is also called .

Most common shorthand notation: 

Convergence in probability The sequence of random variables  is said to converge towards the random variable   if  for every ε > 0.

Most common shorthand notation: 

Strong convergence The sequence of random variables  is said to converge towards the random variable   if .

Most common shorthand notation: 

As the names indicate, weak convergence is weaker than strong convergence. In fact, strong convergence implies convergence in probability, and convergence in probability implies weak convergence. The reverse statements are not always true.

Law of large numbers

Common intuition suggests that if a fair coin is tossed many times, then roughly half of the time it will turn up heads, and the other half it will turn up tails. Furthermore, the more often the coin is tossed, the more likely it should be that the ratio of the number of heads to the number of tails will approach unity. This law is remarkable because it is not assumed in the foundations of probability theory, but instead emerges from these foundations as a theorem. Since it links theoretically derived probabilities to their actual frequency of occurrence in the real world, the law of large numbers is considered as a pillar in the history of statistical theory and has had widespread influence.

The  (LLN) states that the sample average

of a sequence of independent and

It is in the different forms of convergence of random variables that separates the weak and the strong law of large numbers

Weak law:  for 

Strong law:  for 

It follows from the LLN that if an event of probability p is observed repeatedly during independent experiments, the ratio of the observed frequency of that event to the total number of repetitions converges towards p.

For example, if  are independent Bernoulli random variables taking values 1 with probability p and 0 with probability 1-p, then  for all i, so that  converges to p almost surely.

Central limit theorem

The central limit theorem (CLT) explains the ubiquitous occurrence of the normal distribution in nature, and this theorem, according to David Williams, "is one of the great results of mathematics."

The theorem states that the average of many independent and identically distributed random variables with finite variance tends towards a normal distribution irrespective of the distribution followed by the original random variables. Formally, let  be independent random variables with mean  and variance  Then the sequence of random variables

converges in distribution to a standard normal random variable.

For some classes of random variables, the classic central limit theorem works rather fast, as illustrated in the Berry–Esseen theorem. For example, the distributions with finite  first, second, and third moment from the exponential family; on the other hand, for some random variables of the heavy tail and fat tail variety, it works very slowly or may not work at all: in such cases one may use the Generalized Central Limit Theorem (GCLT).

See also

 Catalog of articles in probability theory
 Expected value and Variance
 Fuzzy logic and Fuzzy measure theory
 Glossary of probability and statistics
 Likelihood function
 List of probability topics
 List of publications in statistics
 List of statistical topics
 Notation in probability
 Predictive modelling
 Probabilistic logic – A combination of probability theory and logic
 Probabilistic proofs of non-probabilistic theorems
 Probability distribution
 Probability axioms
 Probability interpretations
 Probability space
 Statistical independence
 Statistical physics
 Subjective logic
 Probability of the union of pairwise independent events

References

Citations

Sources 

 
 The first major treatise blending calculus with probability theory, originally in French: Théorie Analytique des Probabilités.
 
 An English translation by Nathan Morrison appeared under the title Foundations of the Theory of Probability (Chelsea, New York) in 1950, with a second edition in 1956.
 
 Olav Kallenberg; Foundations of Modern Probability, 2nd ed. Springer Series in Statistics. (2002). 650 pp. 
 
 A lively introduction to probability theory for the beginner.
 Olav Kallenberg; Probabilistic Symmetries and Invariance Principles. Springer -Verlag, New York (2005). 510 pp. 
 
 

 

id:Peluang (matematika)